Kai Peter Anthon Ewans (né Nielsen; April 10, 1906 – April 4, 1988) was a Danish-American jazz reedist.

Ewans was born in Hørsholm, Denmark. He played initially as a banjoist, but switched to saxophone in 1923 when he formed the Blues Jazz Band. The group disbanded in 1924, after which Ewans was with Valdemar Eiberg's ensemble from 1924 to 1926. He adopted the name Ewans in 1927, and led Denmark's first big band in 1927–28, thereafter leading bands in Belgium and Germany through 1931. Following this he played with Bernard Etté, Kai Julian (1931–32), and Eric Tuxen (1932–36). He founded a new big band including mostly musicians from Tuxen's ensemble in 1936, and recorded with Benny Carter that year. The band recorded copiously in the 1940s. AllMusic wrote: "Ewans was a potent force behind the development of interest in jazz, and in particular in big band, swing-era-style music in Denmark. His bands were always disciplined, well-rehearsed and enthusiastic outfits, reflecting the best qualities of the leader."

The big band dissolved in 1947, and after this Ewans worked in business in the U.S., moving to California in 1956. From 1960 to 1964 he ran a restaurant with Carter in Beverly Hills, and later in the decade returned to Copenhagen to play again. He retired to Connecticut late in life, and died there on April 4, 1988.

His granddaughter, Vanessa Trump, was married to Donald Trump Jr., and Kai Trump, their daughter, Ewans' great-granddaughter, is named after him.

See also
 Danish jazz
 Family of Donald Trump

References

1906 births
1988 deaths
Danish jazz saxophonists
Male saxophonists
Danish emigrants to the United States
Trump family
20th-century saxophonists
Male jazz musicians
20th-century male musicians